Shahbazi is an Iranian surname. A related surname is Shahbazian. The surname may refer to:

 Abdollah Shahbazi (born 1955), Iranian researcher
 Ali Shahbazi (born 1937), Iranian general
 Alireza Shapour Shahbazi, Iranian archaeologist
 Cameron Shahbazi, Canadian countertenor
 Mehdi Shahbazi, Iranian businessman
 Parviz Shahbazi, Iranian filmmaker

Iranian-language surnames